8'-apo-beta-carotenoid 14',13'-cleaving dioxygenase is an enzyme with systematic name 8'-apo-beta-carotenol:O2 oxidoreductase (14',13'-cleaving). This enzyme catalyses the following chemical reaction

 8'-apo-beta-carotenol + O2  14'-apo-beta-carotenal + an uncharacterized product

8'-apo-beta-carotenoid 14',13'-cleaving dioxygenase is a thiol-dependent enzyme isolated from rat and rabbit.

References

External links 
 

EC 1.13.11